In the Buddhist tradition, the five hindrances (Sinhala: පඤ්ච නීවරණ pañca nīvaraṇa;) are identified  as mental factors that hinder progress in meditation and in our daily lives. In the Theravada tradition, these factors are identified specifically as obstacles to the jhānas (stages of concentration) within meditation practice. Within the Mahayana tradition, the five hindrances are identified as obstacles to samatha (tranquility) meditation. Contemporary Insight Meditation teachers identify the five hindrances as obstacles to mindfulness meditation.

The five hindrances are:

 Sensory desire (kāmacchanda): seeking for pleasure through the five senses of sight, sound, smell, taste and physical feeling.
 Ill-will (vyāpāda; also spelled byāpāda): feelings of hostility, resentment, hatred and bitterness.
 Sloth-and-torpor (thīna-middha): half-hearted action with little or no effort or concentration.
 Restlessness-and-worry (uddhacca-kukkucca): the inability to calm the mind and focus one's energy.
 Doubt (vicikiccha): lack of conviction or trust in one's abilities.

Etymology
According to Gil Fronsdal, the Pali term nīvaraṇa means covering. Fronsdal states that these hindrances cover over: the clarity of our mind, and our ability to be mindful, wise, concentrated, and stay on purpose.

According to Rhys Davids, the Pali term nīvaraṇa (Sanskrit: nivāraṇa) refers to an obstacle or hindrance only in the ethical sense, and is usually enumerated in a set of five.

In Pali Literature

In the Pali Canon
In the Pali Canon's Samyutta Nikaya, several discourses juxtapose the five hindrances with the seven factors of enlightenment (bojjhanga).  For instance, according to SN 46.37, the Buddha stated:

Anālayo underlines:

Anālayo further supports this by identifying that, in all extant Sanskrit and Chinese versions of the Satipatthana Sutta, only the five hindrances and seven factors of enlightenment are consistently identified under the dhamma contemplation section; contemplations of the five aggregates, six sense bases and Four Noble Truths are not included in one or more of these non-Pali versions.

In terms of gaining insight into and overcoming the Five Hindrances, according to the Satipatthana Sutta, the Buddha proclaimed:

Each of the remaining four hindrances are similarly treated in subsequent paragraphs.

The Buddha gives the following analogies in the Samaññaphala Sutta (DN 2, "The Fruits of the Contemplative Life"):

Similarly, in the Sagārava Sutta (SN 46.55), the Buddha compares sensual desire with looking for a clear reflection in water mixed with lac, turmeric and dyes; ill will with boiling water; sloth-and-torpor with water covered with plants and algae; restlessness-and-worry with wind-churned water; and, doubt with water that is "turbid, unsettled, muddy, placed in the dark."

From post-canonical Pali literature

According to the first-century CE exegetic Vimuttimagga, the five hindrances include all ten fetters: sense desire includes any attachment to passion; ill will includes all unwholesome states of hatred; and, sloth and torpor, restlessness and worry, and doubt include all unwholesome states of infatuation.  The Vimuttimagga further distinguishes that "sloth" refers to mental states while "torpor" refers to physical states resultant from food or time or mental states; if torpor results from food or time, then one diminishes it through energy; otherwise, one removes it with meditation.  In addition, the Vimuttimagga identifies four types of doubt: 
 doubt regarding self is a hindrance to tranquility;
 doubt regarding the Four Noble Truths and three worlds is a hindrance to insight;
 doubt regarding the Triple Gem is a hindrance to both tranquility and insight;
 doubt regarding places and people is a hindrance to "non-doctrinal" things;
 doubt regarding the Discourses is a hindrance to solitude.

According to Buddhaghosa's fifth-century CE commentary to the Samyutta Nikaya, one can momentarily escape the hindrances through jhanic suppression or through insight while, as also stated in the Vimuttimagga, one eradicates the hindrances through attainment of one of the four stages of enlightenment (see Table 1).

The five mental factors that counteract the five hindrances, according to the Theravada tradition:
 vitakka ("applied thought," "coarse examination") counteracts sloth-torpor (lethargy and drowsiness)
 vicāra ("sustained thought," "precise investigation") counteracts doubt (uncertainty)
 pīti (rapture, well-being) counteracts ill-will (malice)
 sukha (non-sensual pleasure) counteracts restlessness-worry (excitation and anxiety)
 ekaggatā (one-pointedness, single-pointed attention) counteracts sensory desire

See also
 Five Thieves (in Sikhism)
 Five faults and eight antidotes
 Five precepts
 Pāramitā (the virtues, either six or ten)

Notes

References

Citations

Works cited
 
 
 
 
 

Further reading

External links

 Ajahn Dhiravamso (2008), The Five Hindrances [Dhamma talk video]. Serpentine: Bodhinyana Monastery. Retrieved December 8, 2008 from https://www.youtube.com/watch?v=6xpcD0Y3x7Y
 Dealing with the Five Hindrances, by Sayalay Susila
What are the Five Hinderances?

Buddhist philosophical concepts
Buddhist meditation